The Utah National Guard consists of the:

 Utah Army National Guard
19th Special Forces Group (Airborne)
65th Field Artillery Brigade
85th WMD CST
97th Troop Command
115th Engineer Group (CBT)
204th Maneuver Enhancement Brigade
211th Aviation Group
300th MI Brigade (Linguist)
640th Regiment (RTI)
145th Field Artillery Group
1457th Engineer Combat Battalion
Army Aviation Support Facility (AASF)

 Utah Air National Guard
101st Information Warfare Flight
109th Air Control Squadron
130th Engineering Installation Squadron
151st Air Refueling Wing
191st Air Refueling Squadron
169th Intelligence Squadron
299th Range Control Squadron

See also
Utah State Defense Force

Further reading

External links

 Bibliography of Utah Army National Guard History compiled by the United States Army Center of Military History
 Utah Army National Guard website for soldiers
 Utah Air National Guard website

National Guard (United States)
Military in Utah